Surrey County Cricket Club was established on 22 August 1845; prior to that an informal county team had existed before, and had occasionally appeared in first-class cricket, occasionally playing in the early part of the nineteenth century as Epsom or Godalming. It has since played first-class cricket from 1846, List A cricket from 1963 and Twenty20 cricket from 2003, using a number of home grounds during that time. The Oval in Kennington has played host to the club's first home fixtures in all three formats of the game; in first-class cricket in 1846 against the Marylebone Cricket Club; in List A cricket in 1964 against Gloucestershire; and in Twenty20 cricket against Middlesex in 2003. Surrey have played home matches at fifteen grounds, but have played the majority of their home fixtures at The Oval, which also holds Test, One Day International and Twenty20 International cricket matches.

The fifteen grounds that Surrey have used for home matches since its formation are listed below, with statistics complete through to the end of the 2014 season.

Grounds
Below is a complete list of grounds used by Surrey County Cricket Club in first-class, List A and Twenty20 matches. "Last" and "Matches" columns data are as of September 2018. The Matches totals are for all sides that have played on the ground, but exclude those games that were scheduled but in which there was no play.

Notes

References

Surrey County Cricket Club
Cricket grounds in Surrey
Surrey
Surrey-related lists